This list of privatizations provides links to notable and/or major privatizations.

..

Privatisation by country

Argentina 

 Aerolíneas Argentinas (1990) – former national carrier; renationalized in 2009.
 Agua y Energía Eléctrica (1992–95) – national electricity production company; partitioned and sold.
 Buenos Aires Underground (1994) – given under concession but still owned by the State.
 Empresa Nacional de Correos y Telégrafos (ENCoTel, 1997) – given under concession as Correo Argentino. Re-nationalized in 2003.
 ENTel (national telecommunications company, 1990) – partitioned and sold to France Télécom and to Spanish Telefónica.
 Fábrica Militar de Aviones (FMA, 1995) – sold to Lockheed Martin.
 Ferrocarriles Argentinos (1991–95) – railway lines all over the country (partially re-nationalized).
 Gas del Estado (1992) – national gas company partitioned and sold, among others, to the Spanish Gas Natural company Naturgy.
 Obras Sanitarias de la Nación (water company, 1992–93) - given under concession to the French conglomerate Suez, which operated it under the name Aguas Argentinas; re-nationalized in 2006 as Aguas y Saneamientos Argentinos (AySA).
 Segba (1992) - partitioned and given under concession to Edesur, Edenor and Edelap.
 Yacimientos Petrolíferos Fiscales (YPF, 1991–92) – national oil-company sold to the Spanish Repsol. The Argentinian government in 2004 set up a new state oil company (Enarsa) from scratch, which proved of no use. In 2012, the Argentine Government expropriated 51% of the shares of YPF owned by Repsol.

Australia 

 Commonwealth Oil Refineries 1952 Under Liberal
 Optus 1985 Under Labor
 Commonwealth Bank of Australia 1991 Under Labor
 Qantas 1993 Under labor
 Commonwealth Serum Laboratories 1994 Under Labor
 Electricity and natural gas supply companies in Victoria 1995 Under Liberal
 Telstra 1997 Under Liberal
 Public transport in Melbourne 1999 Under Liberal
 Electricity Trust of South Australia 1999 Under Liberal
 Sydney Airport 2002 Under Liberal
 Medibank 2014 Under Liberal
 Commonwealth Industrial Gases
 Government Cleaning Service in New South Wales
 Government Insurance Office in New South Wales
 Government Printing Service in New South Wales
 State-owned betting-agencies in most states Under Liberal and Labor
 Many long-distance and urban passenger railway services Under Liberal and Labor
 All freight railway services Under Liberal and Labor
 Most State-owned banks Under Liberal and Labor

Austria

1980s 
 OMV (1987, 1989, 1994, 1996; government retains 31.5%)

1990s 
 Simmering-Graz-Pauker (1992–93)
 VOEST-Alpine Eisenbahntechnik (1992–94)
 Austria Mikro Systeme International (1993–94)
 A.S.A. Abfall Service AG (1993)
 VA Technologie (1994, 2003, 2005)
 AT&S (1994)
 Böhler-Uddeholm (1995, 1996, 2003)
 Schoeller-Bleckmann Oilfield Equipment (1995)
 Schoeller-Bleckmann Edelstahlrohr GesmbH (1995)
 Bernhard Steinel Werkzeugmaschinen GmbH (1995)
 VA Stahl AG (1995, 1996, 2001, 2002, 2003, 2005)
 Weiler Werkzeugmaschinen (1995)
 GIWOG-Wohnbaugruppe (1996)
 Vamed AG (1996)
 VA Bergtechnik (1996)
 AMAG Austria Metall AG (1996)
 Salinen Austria (1997)
 Mobilkom Austria (1997)
 Wiener Boerse (1999)
 Bank Austria (1997–98)
 Austria Tabak (1997, 1999, 2001)
 Telekom Austria (1998, 2000, 2002, 2004, 2006; government retains 28.42%)

2000s 
 Österreichische Postsparkasse (2000)
 Vienna International Airport (2000, 2001; regional governments of Vienna and Lower Austria retain 40%)
 Österreichische Staatsdruckerei (2000)
 Dorotheum (2001)
 Strohal Rotations Druck (2002)
 BMG Metall und Recycling (2004)
 VOEST-Alpine Erzberg (2004)
 Österreichische Post (2006; government retains 52.85%)
 Austrian Airlines (2009)

2010s 
  (2016)

Bahrain 

 Bahrain Telecommunications Co. (Q1 2005, $800 million)

Bolivia

Brazil 

 Banco do Estado do Maranhão S.A
 Banespa
 BB Turismo
 CEDAE
 CELMA
 CSN
 Embraer
 Embratel
 Petrobras Distribuidora
 RFFSA
 Terminal Pesqueiro de Manaus
 Terminal Pesqueiro de Vitória
 Telebrás
 Usiminas
 Vale do Rio Doce
 VASP

Canada 

 Teleglobe (1987) – an international telco carrier
 Air Canada (1988)
 Potash Corporation of Saskatchewan (1989)
 Telus (1991), formerly Alberta Government Telephones
 Petro-Canada (1991)
 Nova Scotia Power (1992)
 Canadian National Railway (1995)
 Saskatchewan Wheat Pool (1996)
 Manitoba Telecom Services or MTS (1996)
 Highway 407 (1999) – leased to private operators
 Ontario Hydro (1999) – only partially privatized with Hydro One and Ontario Power Generation, a publicly owned company and crown corporation respectively
 Uranium industry in Saskatchewan

Chile 

 CAP S.A.
 Chilectra
 Colbún S.A.
 CTC
 Enaex
 Empremar
 Endesa
 Entel
 Esval
 IANSA
 Lan Airlines
 Pension Funds (AFP)
 Soquimich

Czechoslovakia 
 Virtually everything after the Velvet Revolution in 1989; see voucher privatization for details.

Egypt 

 The Shebin spinning and weaving factory in Menoufia in the Nile Delta was on strike against/locked out by its new non-Egyptian owners in the wake of the 2011 revolution. Workers and maybe the military now in control of the state were favoring re-nationalization, according to one report. "[L] iberal economic policy is tarred with [the old regime's] corruption," said Michael Wahid Hanna, in Cairo for the U.S.-based Century Foundation. Indorama, the new Indonesian/Thai owner of Shebin, was not quoted in the report. Looking further back to 2000, "well considered public spinners" Shebin El Kom and STIA, were then considered to have a "redundant labor problem ... [but] would otherwise be attractive privatization buying or leasing opportunities for private investors." In 2011, STIA, also known as El Nasr Wool & Selected Textiles, of Alexandria, remained "one of the largest public sector textiles companies."

Finland 
 Finnair
 Sonera (former Telecom Finland)

France

1980s 

 Compagnie Générale d'Electricité became Alcatel (1987)
 Havas (1987)
 IN Groupe (1993)
 Matra (1988)
 Paribas – privatized in 1987 and merged with BNP to form BNP Paribas
 Saint-Gobain – created in 1665 by minister of Finance Jean-Baptiste Colbert; privatized in 1986
 Société Générale privatized in 1987
 Suez – privatized and merged with the stated-owned Gaz de France (GDF) in 2008 to form GDF Suez
 TF1 – first TV channel of France, privatized in 1987

1990s 
 France Télécom   (1998)
 Arcelor (1995)
 Assurances Générales de France (1996)
 Groupe Bull (1997)
 CNP Assurances (1998)
 Compagnie générale transatlantique (1996) – merged with CMA to form CMA-CGM
 Crédit Industriel et Commercial (1998)
 Crédit local de France (1991)
 Le Crédit Lyonnais (1999)
 Elf Aquitaine – privatized in 1994; absorbed by Total
 Eramet (1999)
 Gan (1998)
 Pechiney (1995)
 Renault (1996) – the French state still have 15.01% of the shareholding
 SEITA (1995) – now Altadis
 Total
 Union des Assurances de Paris (1994)

2000s 

 Aéroports de Paris – the French State remains the major shareholder: 52%
 Air France – opening shareholding open in 1999. Merged with KLM and merged to form: Air France-KLM (as 2004, the French State remain 44%). As of 2012, the French State remains 15.8%.
 Credit Lyonnais (a bank ;– privatized in 2001)
 Électricité de France (EDF) (in December 2005 France sold 30% of EDF)
 French Highway Concession
 A'lienor – sold to Eiffage (65%) and Société des Autoroutes du Nord et de l'Est de la France (35%)
 Alis – sold to Société des Autoroutes du Nord et de l'Est de la France
 Société des Autoroutes de Paris Normandie – sold to Vinci
 Société des Autoroutes du Nord et de l'Est de la France – sold to Abertis (52,5%); the rest is owned by other investors
 Autoroutes Paris-Rhin-Rhône – sold to Eiffage
 Autoroutes du Sud de la France – sold to Vinci
 Arcour – sold to Vinci
 Atlandes – sold to Colas Group (subsidiaries of Bouygues) and other investors
 Cofiroute – sold to Vinci
 Gaz de France (GDF) – Prime minister Dominique de Villepin announced a merger between GDF and Suez; since the state owns 80% of GDF, a privatization of GDF would require the passing of a new law; the state would control only 34% of the capital of the new group: see commentary.
 Orange S.A. (formerly France Télécom) (the French State has owned under 50% of Orange since September 2004) – the French State remains (including ERAP): 26,94%
 Pages Jaunes (Yellow Pages) (in 2004 France sold 32% of Pages Jaunes for €1.25 billion)
 Snecma (in 2004 France sold 35% of Snecma for €1.45 billion)
 Société nationale industrielle aérospatiale (2000) – merged with DASA and CASA to form the European Aeronautic Defence and Space Company
 Thomson Multimédia
 Thomson Multimédia – now Technicolor
 Thomson-CSF – now Thales Group; the French State remains 27%
 SNCM (Société Nationale Maritime Corse Méditerranée) – ferry-company; privatized at the end of 2005; the French State remains 25% in SNCM

2010s 
 Française des Jeux (FDJ) – in 2019 the French State sold off around 50% of its shares retaining 20%

Germany 

 Deutsche Bundespost became in January 1995:
 Deutsche Post – the state owns 20.5% through the KfW.
 Deutsche Telekom – the state still owns 32%, partly direct and partly through the KfW.
 Deutsche Postbank – in 2004 the state floated a minority stake for €2.5 billion
 Deutsche Bundesbahn became Deutsche Bahn in 1994, although it is 100% state owned.
 UFA underwent privatization in 1921

Ghana

Guinea

Greece 

 DESFA – On 20 December 2018, a consortium formed by Snam (60%), Enagás (20%) and Fluxys (20%) completed the acquisition of a 66% stake in DESFA for an amount of €535 million.
 Hellenic Petroleum – Starting from the 1990s, the Greek Government gradually sold its shares in the company, and currently owns only 35.5% of the shares.
 Hellenic Vehicle Industry (ELVO) – In December 2020, 79% of the shares were acquired by an Israeli consortium formed by Plasan and SK Group. The Hellenic state continues to retains 21% of the shares.
 Olympic Airways – at first, then Olympic Airlines; the Hellenic State attempted to privatise the ailing airlines five times, more or less, from 2004 onwards. The company was folded and re-created in 2009, and privatized in 2012, under the supervision of the EU and IMF, as it was part of the debt-restructuring process of 2012.
 OPAP (Lottery and Betting Monopoly) – privatization completed in 2013, when the last remaining government-owned stock was sold
 OTE (Οργανισμός Τηλεπικοινωνιών Ελλάδος / Hellenic Telecommunications Company) – became partly privatised in the 1990s, when its only shareholder at the time, the Hellenic State, reduced its share of the company to 36%. Since May 2018, Deutsche Telekom owns 45% of the shares, and the Hellenic State has retained 5%.
 Piraeus Port Authority – In April 2016, HRADF sold 51% of Piraeus Port Authority to the COSCO Group.
 Public Power Corporation – In 2001, PPC carried out a share flotation on the Athens Stock Exchange and consequently was no longer wholly owned by the government, although it was still controlled by it with a 51.12% stake until 2021. The company was privatised in November 2021, when the Greek government decreased its shareholding to 34.12% and transferred it to the Greek sovereign wealth fund, the Hellenic Corporation of Assets and Participations (HCAP).
 Thessaloniki Port Authority – In March 2018, an international consortium acquired 67% of the shares, with the Hellenic State retaining 7.27%.
 TrainOSE – It was acquired in September 2017 by the Italian railway company, Ferrovie dello Stato Italiane.

Hong Kong, China 
 Hong Kong Mail Service
 Link REIT
 MTR Corporation

Honduras

Iceland 

 Búnaðarbanki Íslands hf – privatized in 1999–2003
 Landsbanki Íslands hf – privatized in 1999–2003
 Landssími Íslands hf – privatized in 2005
 Skýrr hf – privatized in 1997–1998

India 

 Air India – sold to Tata Group in 2020
 Bharat Aluminium Company – sold to Vedanta Limited in 2000
 CMC Limited – sold to Tata Consultancy Services in 2001
 Lagan Engineering – in 2001
 Hindustan Zinc Limited – sold to Vedanta Limited in 2001
 Maruti Udyog Limited
 Modern Food Industries – sold to Hindustan Unilever in 2000
 Videsh Sanchar Nigam Limited – sold to Tata Group in 2008
 Jessop & Company – sold to Ruia Group in 2003
 Indian Petrochemicals Corporation Limited – sold to Reliance Industries
 Hindustan Petroleum - sold to Oil and Natural Gas Corporation in 2017
 IDBI Bank - 51% majority sold to LIC in 2019
 Following Airports:
 Jaipur International Airport – owned and operated by public–private consortium led by Adani Group
 Cochin International Airport
 Mangalore International Airport  – owned and operated by public–private consortium led by Adani Group
 Thiruvananthapuram International Airport  – owned and operated by public–private consortium led by Adani Group
 Indira Gandhi International Airport - Delhi  – owned and operated by public–private consortium led by GMR Group
 Chaudhary Charan Singh Airport - Lucknow  – owned and operated by public–private consortium led by Adani Group
 Rajiv Gandhi International Airport - Hyderabad  – owned and operated by public–private consortium led by GMR Group
 Chhatrapati Shivaji Maharaj International Airport - Mumbai  – owned and operated by public–private consortium led by Adani Group
 Sardar Vallabhbhai Patel International Airport - Ahmedabad  – owned and operated by public–private consortium led by Adani Group
 Lokpriya Gopinath Bordoloi International Airport - Guwahati  – owned and operated by public–private consortium led by Adani Group

Indonesia 

 Aneka Gas Industri (partially sold to Messer Group and PT Tira Austenite in 1996, fully sold to Samator Gas in 2004)
 Indosat (sold to Temasek Holdings in 2002–2003)

Iran

Iraq 
 (planned) most industries except oil, at the behest of the United States-sponsored government

Ireland 
 ACCBank – sold to Rabobank
 Aer Lingus – floated on the stock market
 British and Irish Steampacket Company Limited – sold to Irish Continental Group
 Cablelink – sold to NTL Ireland; formerly held 50/50 by Telecom Éireann and Raidió Teilifís Éireann, both state-owned at the time
 ICC Bank – sold to Bank of Scotland
 Irish Life – sold to Irish Permanent
 Irish National Petroleum Corporation – all assets sold to ConocoPhillips, still exists in law
 Irish Steel – transferred ownership to Ispat, firm bankrupt, no longer exists
 Irish Sugar – floated on stock market as Greencore; state retains one share for veto purposes
 Nítrigin Éireann – sold to its other shareholder in Irish Fertiliser Industries, Richardsons, final firm called IFI, no longer exists
 Telecom Éireann – floated on the stock market
 TSB Bank – bought by Irish Life and Permanent from the Government of Ireland in 2001

Israel 

 Bezeq
 El Al
 Bank Hapoalim
 Bank Leumi (partial)
 Israel Chemicals
 Israel Discount Bank (partial)
 RAFAEL Armament Development Authority (partial)
 Zim Integrated Shipping Services

Italy 
 INA Assitalia
 Enel S.p.A. (1999 32% €16.6 billion, 2003 6.6% €2.2 billion, 2004 20% €7.5 billion)
 Eni
 IRI (among which are Autostrade s.p.a., Credito Italiano)
 Telecom Italia
 Terna (Enel sold 43.5% for €1.48 billion in June 2004)

Japan 
 Japan Airlines
 Japan Highway Public Corporation
 Japan Post (half-privatized)
 Japan Railways Group (formerly Japanese National Railways)
 Japan Tobacco
 New Tokyo International Airport Authority (Narita)
 Nippon Express
 Nippon Telegraph and Telephone

Jordan 
 Aramex International (Q1 2005, 75% for $150–200 million)
 Jordan Telecom
 Queen Alia International Airport

South Korea 
 Korea Electric Power (KEPCO; half-privatized)
 Korea Telecom
 KOGAS
 KT&G (Korea Tobacco & Ginseng)
 POSCO (Pohang Iron & Steel)

Kuwait 
 Kuwait Finance House (November 2004, 25% of the company for $1 billion)

Malaysia 
 Johor Water Corporation
 Keretapi Tanah Melayu Berhad – national railway company
 Malaysia Airlines
 Malaysia Airports Holdings
 Pasir Gudang Local Authority
 Pos Malaysia – national postal services
 Senai International Airport
 Telekom Malaysia
 Tenaga National Berhad – national electricity-generation and distribution

Mexico 
1,150 public companies, including banks, railroads, the telephone company, mines, roads, TV stations, ports, airports, airlines, sugar mills, and retirement funds.

Morocco

Netherlands 

 PTT, the mail and telecom company

New Zealand 

 Air New Zealand – privatized in 1989, subsequently rescued by the Government of New Zealand in 2001
 Auckland Airport
 Bank of New Zealand – semi-privatized in 1987; rescued by the Crown in 1990; sold off in 1992
 Electricity Corporation of New Zealand (ECNZ) – part of which became privatized as Contact Energy in the period 1995–1998
 Government Print
 Ministry of Works and Development
 Natural Gas Corporation (NGC), ultimately absorbed into Vector Limited
 New Zealand Steel – privatized from 1987, now part of BlueScope
 The Post Office Savings Bank (POSB) – bought by the ANZ Bank in 1989
 Telecom New Zealand – privatized in 1990
 New Zealand Rail Limited – privatized in 1993, became Tranz Rail Limited in 1995; the government subsequently repurchased the track lease
 various council-controlled organisations formerly owned by territorial authorities: see also Local Authority Trading Enterprises (LATEs)

Norway 
 Arcus (sold to Sucra in 2001)
 Christiania Bank og Kreditkasse (sold to Nordea in 2000)
 DnB NOR (floated on the stock market in 1995, government retains 34%)
 Finnmark Fylkesrederi og Ruteselskap (sold to Veolia Transport Norge in 2003)
 Fredrikstad Energi (49% sold to Fortum)
 Kongsberg Gruppen (floated on the stock market in 1993, government retains 50%)
 Norsk Medisinaldepot (sold to Celesio in 2001)
 NSB Gods (now CargoNet, partially sold to Green Cargo in 2002, NSB retains 55%)
 Oslo Energi (parts merged with Hafslund)
 Postbanken (merged with DnB NOR in 1999)
 Statkorn (floated on the stock market as Cermaq in 2000, government retains 44%)
 Statoil (floated on the stock market in 2001, government retains 71%)
 Telenor (floated on the stock market in 2000, government retains 54%)
 TrønderBilene (66% sold to Fosen Trafikklag in 1999)
 Østfold Energi (parts sold to Fortum in 2001)
 Årdal og Sunndal Verk (merged with Norsk Hydro in 1986)

Pakistan 

 National Refinery Limited (acquired by Attock Group of Companies in July 2005)
 Pakistan Telecom sold out to Eitisalat in 2006.

Peru 

 AeroPeru – Peruvian Air Transport Enterprise (sold to Aeroméxico in 1993, closed in 1999)
 ENATRU – National Urban Transport Enterprise (sold to the employees)
 Empresa Regional de Servicio Público de Electricidad del Sur Medio – ELECTRODUNAS (Sold to HICA)
 SIDERPERU  (Sold to Sider Corporation S.A)
 PESCAPERU – Fishing National Enterprise
 MINEROPERU – Peruvian National Mining Company
 Tintaya (sold to Magma Copper Corporation)
 Ilo Mining (sold to Southern Peru Copper Corporation, and since 2018 is part of Grupo Mexico)
 Centromin – Mining of Central Peru
 Hierro Peru (Sold to Shougang Group)
 National Company of Gas – SOL GAS (sold to Repsol)
 EDEGEL (sold to Endesa in 1996, since 2016 is part of Enel)
 ENAFER (Parts of Peru Rail, Fetransa and FCCA)
 CPT – ENTEL (Sold to Telefonica in 1994)
 EDELNOR  (sold to Endesa in 1994, since 2016 is part of Enel)
 EDELSUR (sold to Sempra Energy in 1994, since 2019 is part of CTG)
 Banco Continental del Peru (Sold to BBV and since 1999 part of BBVA)
 Inter bank (Part of Banco Internacional del Peru)

Philippines

Poland 

 Telekomunikacja Polska S.A.

Portugal 
 ANA – Aeroportos de Portugal (Portuguese airports)
 CIMPOR
 CTT – Portuguese post
 EDP – Energia de Portugal
 Fidelidade – the insurance part of the CGD public bank
 Galp Energia – national petroleum company
 Portugal Telecom – national telecommunications company
 REN – Rede Eléctrica Nacional
 TAP – airline

Qatar 
 Qatargas (Q1 2005, 50% for $600 million)

Romania 
 Rompetrol – petroleum company (1993 & 1998)
 Ursus Breweries – beer brewer and distributor (1996)
 Romcim (now Lafarge Romania) – industrial materials company (1997)
 Casial Hunedoara (now HeidelbergCement Romania) – industrial materials company (1997)
 Romtelecom (now Telekom Romania) – telecommunications company (1998 & 2003)
 BRD – Groupe Société Générale – bank (1999)
 Automobile Dacia – car manufacturer (1999)
 Astra Rail Industries – rail vehicle manufacturer (1999 & 2000)
 Petromidia Refinery – oil refinery (2000)
 Sidex (now ArcelorMittal Galați) – steelworks (2001)
 Alro – aluminium company (2002)
 Petrom – petroleum company (2004)
 Banca Comercială Română – bank (2003 & 2006)
 Electrica – electricity distributor (2006, 2008 & 2014)
 Automobile Craiova (now Ford Romania) – car manufacturer (2007)

Russia 

A wide-scale privatization program was launched in 1992–1994, using a voucher privatization scheme; from 1995, a monetary scheme was used.
 Gazprom (1994)
 LUKoil (1995)
 Mechel (1995)
 MMC Norilsk Nickel (1995)
 Novolipetsk Steel (1995)
 Surgutneftegaz (1995)
 YUKOS (1995)

Saudi Arabia 
 Al-Bilad Bank (2008, 50%)
 Bank Al-Inma (2008, 70%)
 Government Hotels (2005, 100% of King Abdullah International Convention Centre in Jeddah and Ritz Carlton in Riyadh)
 Maaden (2008, 50%)
 National Commercial Bank (2014, 25%)
 Riyad Bank (2008, 58%)
 SABIC (1984, 30%)
 Saudi Arabian Airlines (2006, split into 10 business units, 5 of which were privatized)
 Saudi Electric Company (2000, 26%)
 Saudi Ports (1997, 27 management contracts were given out to various ports around the Kingdom)
 Saudi Real Estate Company (2003, 50%)
 Saudi Telecom Company (2002, 30%)

Singapore 
 Port of Singapore Authority (1997)
 Post Office Savings Bank (bought by DBS Bank in 1998 and rebranded as POSBank)
 Singapore Broadcasting Corporation (1994, as the Television Corporation of Singapore; later renamed MediaCorp in 2001) – owned by the government through government-owned investment firms
 Singapore Post – owned by the government through government-owned investment firms
 Singapore Power – owned by the government through government-owned investment firms
 Singapore Telecommunications (1992) – owned by the government through government-owned investment firms

Slovakia

South Africa 

 Iscor – Now known as ArcelorMittal South Africa, the company was privatised in 1989.
 Telkom – Gradually privatised starting with the IPO in 2003. The government currently holds 39%, and is planning on selling its entire stake.

Spain 
 Aceralia
 Argentaria
 ENDESA (1988–1998)
 Gas Natural
 Iberia Airlines (2001)
 Indra
 Red Electrica de España
 Repsol (1989–1997)
 Retevision
 SEAT (1986)
 Tabacalera

Sweden

1980s 
 ASEA-ATOM (1981) -
 Luxor AB (1984)
 SSAB (1986–1994)
 UV Shipping (1988)

1990s 
 AssiDomän
 Celsius
 Cementa
 Enator
 Företagskapital
 Industrikredit AB
 Lantbrukskredit AB
 Nordbanken (partial)
 OK Petroleum
 Pharmacia
 Pharmacia & Upjohn
 SAKAB
 SAQ Kontrol
 SBL Vaccin
 SEMKO
 SSAB (wholly privatised in 1994)
 Stadshypotek AB
 Svalöf Weibull AB
 Svensk Fastighetsvärdering
 Svenska Statens Språkresor AB
 Swedish Real Estate Valuation Corp
 VPC AB

2000s 
 Celsius AB
 Grängesbergs Gruvor
 Kurortsverksamhet
 Nordbanken
 OMX – stock exchange – shares sold to Borse Dubai for 2.1 billion SEK.
 SAKAB
 SGAB
 Svenska Lagerhus
 Svenska
 Vin & Sprit – sold to Pernod Ricard for 5.626 billion euro

2010s 
 Nordea (19.5% owned by Swedish government)

Planned privatisations 
 Apoteket (partial, 2009)
 SBAB
 SAS (50% owned by Swedish, Danish, Norwegian governments)
 Telia Sonera (37.3% owned by the Swedish government)

Tanzania

Turkey 

(Listing Scope >US $10 M.)

1980s 
 Ankara Çimento
 Ansan-Meda
 Balikesi̇r Çimento
 Pinarhi̇sar Çimento
 Söke Çimento

1990s 
 Adiyaman Çimento
 Anadolubank
 Aşkale Çimento
 Bartin Çimento
 Bozüyük Seramik
 Çİnkur
 Çorum Çimento
 Denİzbank
 Denİzlİ Çimento
 Elaziğ Çimento
 Erganİ Çimento
 Etİbank
 Fİlyos
 Gazİantep Çimento
 Güneş Sigorta Spor Kulübü
 Havaş
 Ipragaz
 İskenderun Çimento
 Kars Çimento
 Konya Krom Man.A.Ş.
 Kümaş
 Kurtalan Çimento
 Ladİk Çimento
 Lalapaşa Çimento
 Metaş
 Petlas
 Ray Sigorta
 Şanliurfa Çimento
 Sİvas Çimento
 Sümerbank
 Trabzon Çimento
 Türk Kablo
 Tofaş S.K.
 Van Çimento Sanayii
 Yarimca Porselen T.A.Ş.

2000s 
 Adapazarı Sugar Fac.
 Asİl Çelİk
 Ataköy Hotel
 Ataköy Marina
 Ataköy Tourism
 Başak Insurance
 Başak Retirement Fund
 Bet Kütahya Şeker
 Bursagaz
 Çayelİ Bakir İşl.A.Ş.
 Cyprus Turkish Airlines
 Denİz Naklİyati T.A.Ş.
 Esgaz
 Eti Aluminium
 Etİ Bakir
 Etİ Elektrometalurji
 Etİ Gümüş A.Ş.
 Etİ Krom A.Ş.
 Güven Sİgorta
 Dİv-Han
 Taksan
 Türk Telekom

Ukraine 
 Kryvorizhstal

United Arab Emirates 
 Damas Jewelry (November 2004, 55% of the company for $224 million)

United Kingdom

1970s 
 Lunn Poly (1971)
 Thomas Cook (1972)
 Rolls-Royce Motors (1973)
 State Management Scheme (1973)
 British Petroleum (1977, 1979, 1981, 1987)
 International Computers Limited (1979)

1980s 
 British Aerospace (1981, 1985)
 Alvis (1981)
 Coventry Climax (1982)
 Amersham International (1982)
 Associated British Ports (1983, 1984)
 Sealink (1984)
 Jaguar (1984)
 Trustee Savings Bank (1985)
 British Airways Helicopters (1986)
 British Gas (1986)
 Rolls-Royce (1987)
 Royal Ordnance (1987)
 British Airports Authority (1987)
 Danish Automobile Building (1987)
 ISTEL (1987)
 Leyland Bus (1987)
 British Airways (1987)
 British Leyland
 Leyland Tractors (1982)
 Leyland Trucks (1987)
 Rover Group (1988)
 Unipart (1987)
 British Rail Engineering Limited (1989)
 British Shipbuilders (1985–1989, shipbuilder companies sold individually)
 British Steel plc (1988)
 British Sugar (1981)
 British Telecom (1984, 1991, 1993)
 British Transport Hotels (1983)
 Britoil (1982, 1985)
 Cable and Wireless (1981, 1983, 1985)
 Council houses (1980–present, over two million sold to their tenants) – see main article Right to buy scheme
 Enterprise Oil (1984)
 Fairey (1980)
 Ferranti (1982)
 Harland and Wolff (1989)
 Inmos (1984)
 Municipal bus companies (1988–present, bus companies sold individually) – see main article Bus deregulation in Great Britain
 National Bus Company (1986–1988, bus companies sold individually)
 National Express (1988)
 National Freight Corporation (1982)
 Passenger transport executive bus companies (1988–1994, bus companies sold individually)
 Travellers Fare (1988)
 Vale of Rheidol Railway (1989)
 Water companies – see main article Water privatisation in England and Wales
 Anglian Water (1989)
 North West Water (1989)
 Northumbrian Water (1989)
 Severn Trent (1989)
 South West Water (1989)
 Southern Water (1989)
 Thames Water (1989)
 Welsh Water (1989)
 Wessex Water (1989)
 Yorkshire Water (1989)

1990s 
 AEA Technology (1996)
 Agricultural Development and Advisory Service (1997)
 Belfast International Airport (1994)
 Birmingham Airport (1993 – 51%)
 Bournemouth Airport (1995)
 Bristol Airport (1997, 2001)
 British Coal (1994)
 British Energy (1996)
 British Rail – see main article Privatisation of British Rail
 3 rolling stock companies:
 Angel Trains (1996)
 Eversholt Leasing (1996)
 Porterbrook (1996)
 6 design office units (1995–1997, sold individually)
 6 freight operating companies
 Freightliner (1995)
 Loadhaul (1996)
 Mainline Freight (1996)
 Rail Express Systems (1996)
 Railfreight Distribution (1997)
 Transrail Freight (1996)
 6 track renewal units (1995–1997, sold individually)
 7 infrastructure maintenance units (1995–1997, sold individually)
 25 train operating companies (1996, operations contracted out as franchises)
 British Rail Research (1996)
 British Rail Telecommunications (1995)
 European Passenger Services (1996)
 Railtrack (1996) (18 October 2002 went into voluntary liquidation), now in public ownership as Network Rail
 Red Star Parcels (1995)
 Union Railways (1996)
 British Technology Group (1992)
 Building Research Establishment (1997)
 Cardiff Airport (1995)
 Central Electricity Generating Board
 National Grid (1990)
 National Power (1991, 1995)
 Powergen (1991, 1995)
 Chessington Computer Centre (1996)
 Department for National Savings (1999, back office functions contracted out)
 East Midlands Airport (1993)
 Girobank (1990)
 Humberside Airport (1999 – 82%)
 Kingston Communications (1999, 2007)
 Laboratory of the Government Chemist (1996)
 Liverpool Airport (1990, 2001)
 London Buses (1994, bus companies sold individually) – see main article Privatisation of London bus services
 London Luton Airport (1997)
 London Southend Airport (1993)
 National Engineering Laboratory (1995)
 National Transcommunications Limited (1990)
 Natural Resources Institute (1996)
 Northern Ireland Electricity (1993)
 Property Services Agency (1994)
 Regional electricity companies
 East Midlands Electricity (1990)
 Eastern Electricity (1990)
 London Electricity (1990)
 MANWEB (1990)
 Midlands Electricity (1990)
 Northern Electric (1990)
 NORWEB (1990)
 SEEBOARD (1990)
 Southern Electric (1990)
 SWALEC (1990)
 SWEB Energy (1990)
 Yorkshire Electricity (1990)
 Scottish Bus Group (1991, bus companies sold individually)
 Scottish Hydro-Electric (1991)
 Scottish Power (1991)
 Severn Bridge (1992)
 The Stationery Office (1996)
 Student loans portfolios (1998, 1999, 2013)
 Transport Research Laboratory (1996)
 Trust Ports (1992–1997, ports sold individually)

2000s 
 Actis (2004, 2012)
 BBC Books (2006 – 85%)
 BBC Broadcast (2005)
 BBC Costumes and Wigs (2008)
 BBC Outside Broadcasts (2008)
 BBC Technology (2004)
 British Nuclear Fuels Limited
 AWE Management Limited (2008)
 BNG America (2007)
 BNG Project Services (2008)
 Reactor Sites Management Company (2007)
 Westinghouse Electric Company (2006)
 East Thames Buses (2009)
 Leeds Bradford International Airport (2007)
 National Air Traffic Services (2001 – 51%)
 Newcastle Airport (2001 – 49%)
 Partnerships UK (2000, 2011)
 Qinetiq (2002, 2006, 2008)
 South Eastern Trains (2006)
 Teesside International Airport (2003 – 75%)
 UKAEA Limited (2009)

2010s 
 BBC Audiobooks (2010 – 85%)
 BBC Magazines (2011)
 Behavioural Insights Team (2014 – 67%)
 Bio Products Laboratory (2013 – 80%)
 Constructionline (2015)
 Defence Support Group (2015)
 Dr Foster Intelligence (2015)
 East Coast Trains (2015)
 Eurostar International Limited (2015 – 40%)
 Fire Service College (2013)
 Food and Environment Research Agency (2015 – 75%)
 Government Pipelines and Storage System (2015)
 High Speed 1 (2010; sale of concession to operate for 30 years)
 Lloyds Banking Group (2013, 2014, 2015)
 Manchester Airports Group (2013 – 35%)
 NEC Group (2015)
 Northern Rock (2012)
 Remploy (2012, 2013, 2015, factory businesses sold individually)
 Royal Bank of Scotland Group (2015)
 Royal Mail (2013, 2015)
 The Tote (2011)

United States 

 Conrail
 Federal National Mortgage Association (Fannie Mae)
 Railway Express Agency
 Student Loan Marketing Association (SLM Corporation) (Sallie Mae)

See also 
 Nationalization
 List of nationalizations by country
 Privatization

References

Further reading

External links 
 Sample Firms Privatized Through Public Share Offerings, 1961-August 2000 – Appendix to Juliet D'Souza, William L. Megginson (1999), "The Financial and Operating Performance of Privatized Firms during the 1990s", Journal of Finance August 1999
 Institute of Mergers, Acquisitions and Alliances (IMAA) M&A – Academic research institute on mergers & acquisitions, including privatization

Business-related lists
 Country
 
Politics-related lists
Economics lists by country